İkinci Alxasava (also, Alkhasava Vtoroye and Ikindzhi-Alkhasova) is a village in the Goychay Rayon of Azerbaijan.

References 

Populated places in Goychay District